Aleksandr or Alexander Smirnov may refer to:

Footballers
Aleksandr Smirnov (footballer, born 1968), Russian football player and coach
Aleksandr Smirnov (footballer, born 1980), Russian football player
Aleksandr Smirnov (footballer, born 1982), Russian football player
Aleksandr Smirnov (footballer, born 1996), Russian football player

Politicians
Aleksandr Aleksandrovich Smirnov (1958–2021), Russian politician
Aleksandr Petrovich Smirnov (1877–1938), USSR politician
Aleksandr Smirnov (1907–1997), USSR politician, member of Central Committee elected by the 24th Congress of the Communist Party of the Soviet Union 
Alexander Smirnov (1909–1972), USSR politician, member of  Central Committee elected by the 24th Congress of the Communist Party of the Soviet Union 
Aleksandr Smirnov (1912-1997), USSR politician, member of Central Committee elected by the 25th Congress of the Communist Party of the Soviet Union 
Aleksey Smirnov (1921–unknown), USSR politician, member of Central Committee elected by the 26th Congress of the Communist Party of the Soviet Union

Others
Alexander Smirnov (figure skater) (born 1984), Russian pair skater with Yuko Kavaguti
Alexander Smirnov (ice hockey) (born 1964), Russian ice-hockey player
Aleksandr Smirnov (table tennis) (born 1985), Estonian in 2015 World Table Tennis Championships – Mixed Doubles
Aleksandr Smirnov (sprinter) (born 1974), Russian athlete; competed for Russia at the 2000 Summer Olympics
Alexander Smirnov (bridge) (b. 1983), German bridge player

See also
 Smirnov (surname)
 Smirnoff (surname)